André Candançam Pinto (born 14 December 1978) is a Brazilian retired professional footballer who played as a striker.

Club career
In his country, São Paulo-born Pinto played for Associação Atlética Flamengo, Esporte Clube XV de Novembro (Piracicaba) and Associação Atlética Portuguesa (RJ). In January 2003 he moved to Portugal and joined C.D. Nacional, appearing in only ten Primeira Liga matches over his first two seasons and also being loaned to C.D. Santa Clara in the Segunda Liga; he made his debut in the former competition on 2 February 2003, scoring in a local derby against C.S. Marítimo, a 3–2 away win.

Pinto returned to Madeira for a further two seasons with Nacional, netting 14 times in 30 games in his second as the club qualified for the second time in its history to the UEFA Cup, after finishing fifth. Highlights included braces against Académica de Coimbra (2–2 home draw), Boavista FC (3–0 away win), Vitória de Setúbal (2–2, home) and C.F. Os Belenenses (4–0, at home).

Subsequently, Pinto spent two years in Japan with Kyoto Sanga FC, scoring only three goals in his first season, which ended in relegation from the J1 League. On 31 January 2008, he returned to Portugal and signed for Marítimo as a replacement for S.L. Benfica-bound Ariza Makukula, but the following two campaigns in the country, with that side and F.C. Paços de Ferreira, yielded only a total of 11 appearances and two goals.

In 2010, Pinto returned to his homeland after nearly eight years, joining amateurs São José Esporte Clube.

References

External links

1978 births
Living people
Brazilian footballers
Footballers from São Paulo
Association football forwards
Campeonato Brasileiro Série A players
Esporte Clube XV de Novembro (Piracicaba) players
Associação Atlética Portuguesa (RJ) players
São José Esporte Clube players
Primeira Liga players
Liga Portugal 2 players
C.D. Nacional players
C.D. Santa Clara players
C.S. Marítimo players
F.C. Paços de Ferreira players
J1 League players
J2 League players
Kyoto Sanga FC players
Brazilian expatriate footballers
Expatriate footballers in Portugal
Expatriate footballers in Japan
Brazilian expatriate sportspeople in Portugal
Brazilian expatriate sportspeople in Japan